This is a list of gases at standard conditions, which means substances that boil or sublime at or below 25 °C (77 °F) and 1 atm pressure and are reasonably stable.

List
This list is sorted by boiling point of gases in ascending order, but can be sorted on different values. "sub" and "triple" refer to the sublimation point and the triple point, which are given in the case of a substance that sublimes at 1 atm; "dec" refers to decomposition. "~" means approximately.

Known as gas
The following list has substances known to be gases, but with an unknown boiling point.
Fluoroamine
Trifluoromethyl trifluoroethyl trioxide CF3OOOCF2CF3 boils between 10 and 20°
Bis-trifluoromethyl carbonate boils between −10 and +10° possibly +12, freezing −60°
Difluorodioxirane boils between −80 and −90°.
Difluoroaminosulfinyl fluoride F2NS(O)F is a gas but decomposes over several hours
Trifluoromethylsulfinyl chloride CF3S(O)Cl
Nitrosyl cyanide ?−20° blue-green gas 4343-68-4
Thiazyl chloride NSCl greenish yellow gas; trimerises.

Possible
This list includes substances that may be gases. However reliable references are not available.
 cis-1-Fluoro-1-propene
 trans-1-Chloropropene ?
 cis-1-Chloropropene ?
 Perfluoro-1,2-butadiene
 Perfluoro-1,2,3-butatriene −5 polymerizes
 Perfluoropent-2-ene 
 Perfluoropent-1-ene 29-30°
 tris(Trifluoromethyl)phosphine 17.3
 Trifluoromethanesulfenylfluoride CF3SF
 Difluorocarbamyl fluoride F2NCOF −52°
 N-Sulfinyltrifluoromethaneamine CF3NSO 18°
 (Chlorofluoromethyl)silane 373-67-1 
 difluoromethylsilane 420-34-8 
 trifluoromethyl sulfenic trifloromethyl ester
 pentafluoro(penta-fluorethoxy)sulfur 900001-56-6 15°
 ethenol 557-75-5 10.5° =vinyl alcohol (tautomerizes)
 1,1,1,2,2,3,4,4,4-nonafluorobutane 2-10° melt −129°
 trans-2H-Heptafluoro-2-butene
 pentafluoroethylhypochlorite around −10°
 trifluoromethyl pentafluoroethyl sulfide 6° 33547-10-3 
 1,1,1-Trifluoro-N-(trifluoromethoxy)methanamine 671-63-6 0.6°
 1-chloro-1,1,2,2,3,3-hexafluoropropane 422-55-9 16.7
 1-chloro-1,1,2,3,3,3-hexafluoropropane 359-58-0 17.15
 2-chloro-1,1,1,2,3,3-hexafluoropropane 51346-64-6 16.7°
 3-chloro-1,1,1,2,2,3-hexafluoropropane 422-57-1 16.7°
 trifluormethyl 1,2,2,2-tetrafluoroethyl ether 2356-62-9 11°
 2-chloro-1,1,1,3,3-pentafluoropropane HFC-235da 134251-06-2 8°
 1,1,2,3,3-pentafluoropropane 24270-66-4 −3.77
 2,2,3,3,4,5,5-heptafluoro oxolane
 (Heptafluoropropyl)carbonimidic difluoride 378-00-7
 Pentafluoroethyl carbonimidic difluoride 428-71-7
 (Trifluoromethyl)carbonimidic difluoride 371-71-1 CF3N=CF2
 [[perfluoro[n-methyl-(propylenamine)]]] 680-23-9
 Perfluoro-N,N-dimethylvinylamine 13821-49-3
 [[3,3,4-trifluoro-2,4-bis-trifluoromethyl-[1,2]oxazetidine]] 714-52-3
 bis(trifluoromethyl) 2,2-difluoro-vinylamine 13747-23-4
 bis(trifluoromethyl) 1,2-difluoro-vinylamine 13747-24-5
 1,1,2-Trifluoro-3-(trifluoromethyl)cyclopropane 2967-53-5
 bis(trifluoromethyl) 2-fluoro-vinylamine 25211-47-6
 2-Fluoro-1,3-butadiene 381-61-3
 trifluormethylcyclopropane 381-74-8
 cis-1-fluoro-1-butene 66675-34-1
 trans-1-fluoro-1-butene 66675-35-2
 2-Fluoro-1-butene
 3-Fluoro-1-butene
 trans-1-fluoro-2-butene
 cis-2-fluoro-2-butene
 trans-2-fluoro-2-butene
 1-fluoro-2-methyl-1-propene
 3-fluoro-2-methyl-1-propene
 perfluoro-2-methyl-1,3-butadiene 384-04-3
 1,1,3,4,4,5,5,5-octafluoro-1,2-pentadiene 21972-01-0

Near misses
This list includes substances that boil just above standard condition temperatures. Numbers are boiling temperatures in °C.
 1,1,2,2,3-Pentafluoropropane 25–26 °C
 Dimethoxyborane 25.9 °C
 1,4-Pentadiene 25.9 °C
 2-Bromo-1,1,1-trifluoroethane 26 °C
 1,2-Difluoroethane 26 °C
 Hydrogen cyanide 26 °C
trimethylgermane 26.2 °C
 1,H-Pentafluorocyclobut-1-ene
 1,H:2,H-hexafluorocyclobutane
 Tetramethylsilane 26.7 °C
 Chlorosyl trifluoride 27 °C
 2,2-Dichloro-1,1,1-trifluoroethane 27.8 °C
 Perfluoroethyl 2,2,2-trifluoroethyl ether 27.89 °C
 Perfluoroethyl ethyl ether 28 °C
 perfluorocyclopentadiene C5F6 28 °C
 2-Butyne 29 °C
 Digermane 29 °C
 Perfluoroisopropyl methyl ether 29 °C
 Trifluoromethanesulfonyl chloride 29–32 °C 
 Perfluoropentane 29.2 °C
 Rhenium(VI) fluoride 33.8 °C
 Chlorodimethylsilane 34.7 °C
 1,2-Difluoropropane 43 °C
 1,3-Difluoropropane 40-42 °C
 Dimethylarsine 36 °C
 Spiro[2.2]pentane 39 °C
 Ruthenium(VIII) oxide 40 °C
 Nickel carbonyl 42.1 °C
 Trimethylphosphine 43 °C

Unstable substances
 Gallane liquid decomposes at 0 °C.
 Nitroxyl and diazene are simple nitrogen compounds known to be gases but they are too unstable and short lived to be condensed.
 Methanetellurol CH3TeH 25284-83-7 unstable at room temperature.
 Sulfur pentafluoride isocyanide isomerises to sulfur pentafluoride cyanide.

References

Gases
Gases